The Ector County Coliseum is a 5,131 seat multi-purpose arena in Odessa, Texas.

Tenants

It is home to the Odessa Jackalopes (North American Hockey League), the West Texas Warbirds (Champions Indoor Football), the Sand Hills Rodeo, and the biennial Permian Basin International Oil Show.

Each January the arena hosts a major rodeo, and the animals are kept in a large hall at one end of the arena. This is the same area that, before hockey games, group picnics are served to as many as 500 people.

In 2019, the arena became home to the FC West Texas Rumbleweeds indoor soccer team.

History
The Coliseum was built in 1954 and was previously the home of the original Odessa Jackalopes team. The Coliseum was the oldest arena still being used for CHL games until the Fort Wayne Komets and their facility, the Allen County War Memorial Coliseum, entered the league in 2010. It was home to the Odessa/West Texas Roughnecks indoor football team from 2004 until the team folded in 2012.

English heavy rock band Deep Purple played the first-ever US gig of their comeback tour at the venue on Jan 18, 1985. 

Elvis Presley played two sold out shows at the coliseum on May 29th - 30th in 1976 

The Professional Bull Riders hosted a Bud Light Cup Series event known as "Top Guns Bull Riding" at the Coliseum annually from 1995 to 2000.

References

External links

Ector County Coliseum website

Sports in Odessa, Texas
Indoor arenas in Texas
Indoor ice hockey venues in the United States
Sports venues in Texas
American football venues in Texas
Sports venues completed in 1954
Buildings and structures in Ector County, Texas
Indoor soccer venues in the United States
1954 establishments in Texas